This is a list of cast members of the South Korean anthology  television series School produced by KBS2. The series have been noted for fielding an entirely different cast in every season of the series. In addition to the core cast members, the School series team also includes several recurring guests throughout each season.

It is also been famous for launching the careers of several rookie actors and actresses.

Main Cast

Supporting Cast

Cameo appearances

Notes

References

School
School